Lawrence Donald Soens (August 26, 1926 – November 1, 2021) was an American prelate of the Roman Catholic Church. In 2008, the Diocese of Davenport in Iowa announced multiple credible accusations that Soens had sexually abused children as a priest. He served as bishop of the Diocese of Sioux City in Iowa from 1983 to 1998.

Life and career

Early life 
Lawrence Soens was born in Iowa City, Iowa, on August 26, 1926. He was educated at Loras College in Dubuque, Iowa, Saint Ambrose College in Davenport, Iowa, and studied for the priesthood at Kenrick Seminary in Shrewsbury, Missouri.  He also completed graduate studies at the University of Iowa in Iowa City, Iowa.

Priesthood 
Soens was ordained a priest by Bishop Ralph Leo Hayes on May 6, 1950, for the Diocese of Davenport.  Soens' first assignment was as an assistant pastor at St. Paul's Parish in Burlington, Iowa. He then joined the faculty of St. Ambrose Academy in Davenport, Iowa and then became the assistant pastor at St. Bridget's Parish in Victor, Iowa.

Soens' next assignment was as director of Regina High School in Iowa City. He went on to become the rector of St. Ambrose Seminary and served on the faculty of St. Ambrose College. His next assignment was as pastor at Assumption Parish in Charlotte, Iowa, and St. Patrick Parish in Villa Nova, Iowa. He was pastor at St. Mary's Parish in Clinton, Iowa, when Pope John Paul II named him a prelate of honor, with the title of monsignor, on December 18, 1981.

Bishop of Sioux City
On June 15, 1983, John Paul II named Soens as the fifth bishop of the Diocese of Sioux City. He was consecrated on August 17, 1983, at the Cathedral of the Ephiphany in Sioux City by Archbishop James Byrne. Bishops Gerald O'Keefe and Frank Greteman were the principal co-consecrators.

In February 1986, Soens received a letter detailing allegations against Jerome Coyle, a diocese priest.  The diocese had sent Coyle to Minnesota to train as a hospital chaplain.  A supervisor in that program wrote Soens that Coyle was exhibiting inappropriate behavior around young boys.  Soens then dispatched Coyle to the Servants of the Paraclete foundation house in Jemez Springs, New Mexico for evaluation and treatment.  On May 15, 1986, the Foundation informed Soens that Coyle had admitted to fondling up to 50 teenagers.  Soens suspended Coyle from parish assignments, but did not report any of his crimes to authorities.

While Soens was bishop, many programs were established or expanded, including: Ministry 2000, the Priests Retirement Fund, youth ministry programs and the diocese mandated parish pastoral and finance commissions.

In 1997, Soens requested a coadjutor bishop to assist him with his duties.  On August 19, 1997, Pope John Paul II named Msgr. Daniel DiNardo from the Diocese of Pittsburgh.

Resignation and legacy

Soens's resignation as bishop of the Diocese of  Sioux City was accepted by John Paul II on November 28, 1998.

On June 8, 2005, Soens and the diocese were sued by a man who accused Soens of fondling him starting in 1963 when Soens was director at Regina Catholic High School in Iowa City. On November 6, 2008, the diocesan review board for the Diocese of Sioux City reported that there were credible accusations that Soens had sexually abused minors.  Thirty-one men had accused him of abusing them between 1950 and 1983.  His case was referred to the Vatican for further action.

Lawrence Soens died in Sioux City, Iowa, on November 1, 2021, at age 95.

See also
 

 Catholic Church hierarchy
 Catholic Church in the United States
 Historical list of the Catholic bishops of the United States
 List of Catholic bishops of the United States
 Lists of patriarchs, archbishops, and bishops

References

External links
 Roman Catholic Diocese of Sioux City Official Site

Episcopal succession

1926 births
2021 deaths
20th-century Roman Catholic bishops in the United States
Catholic Church sexual abuse scandals in the United States
Kenrick–Glennon Seminary alumni
Loras College alumni
People from Iowa City, Iowa
Roman Catholic Diocese of Davenport
Roman Catholic bishops of Sioux City
St. Ambrose University alumni
University of Iowa alumni